Fred Giffin (19 April 1920 – 10 May 1999) was an Australian weightlifter. He competed in the men's middleweight event at the 1952 Summer Olympics.

References

External links
 

1920 births
1999 deaths
Australian male weightlifters
Olympic weightlifters of Australia
Weightlifters at the 1952 Summer Olympics
Weightlifters from Brisbane
Commonwealth Games medallists in weightlifting
Commonwealth Games bronze medallists for Australia
Weightlifters at the 1950 British Empire Games
20th-century Australian people
Medallists at the 1950 British Empire Games